Miodineutes is an extinct genus of fossil beetles in the family Gyrinidae, containing the following species:

 Miodineutes heeri Hatch, 1927
 Miodineutes insignis (Heer, 1862)
 Miodineutes oeningenensis Hatch, 1927

References

†
Fossil taxa described in 1927
†
Prehistoric beetle genera